Trail Riders is a 1928 American silent Western film directed by J.P. McGowan and starring Buddy Roosevelt, Lafe McKee and Betty Baker.

Cast
 Buddy Roosevelt
 Lafe McKee
 Betty Baker
 Gilbert Holmes
 Paul Malvern
 Leon De La Mothe
 Tom Bay

References

Bibliography
 John J. McGowan. J.P. McGowan: Biography of a Hollywood Pioneer. McFarland, 2005.

External links
 

1928 films
1928 Western (genre) films
Films directed by J. P. McGowan
American black-and-white films
Rayart Pictures films
Silent American Western (genre) films
1920s English-language films
1920s American films